Scriber Lake High School (SLHS), located in the city of Edmonds, Washington, is one of five high schools within the Edmonds School District. It is the only High School of Choice within the district.

Move
At the end of the 2006–2007 school year the school campus was closed and everything was moved to the former Woodway Elementary campus. The Edmonds School District plans to demolish the old buildings at the Scriber Lake site and build a new district headquarters there, and remodel the former district headquarters for use as the new permanent site for the high school of choice (yet to be named). District estimates place the date for this final step in 2010.

References

External links 
School maintained website (general information)

High schools in Snohomish County, Washington
Edmonds, Washington
Public high schools in Washington (state)